Bareia is a monotypic moth genus of the family Erebidae. Its only species, Bareia incidens, is found in South Africa. Both the genus and the species were first described by Francis Walker in 1858.

References

Calpinae